BC Zenit Saint Petersburg, formerly known as BC Dynamo Moscow Region (2003–2007) and BC Triumph Lyubertsy (2007–2014), is a Russian professional basketball team that is located in Saint Petersburg, Russia, since 2014. The club competes domestically in the VTB United League, and competed in the EuroLeague. On February 28, 2022, EuroLeague Basketball suspended the team because of the 2022 Russian invasion of Ukraine.

Their home court is Sibur Arena. The club is sponsored by Gazprom. Since the team moved to Saint Petersburg in 2014, the team is a part of the multi-sports club Zenit, of which the football club FC Zenit Saint Petersburg, is also a part. Alexander Tserkovny is a general manager of the club since July 16, 2018.

History

Dynamo Moscow
The club was originally established in 2003, under the name BC Dynamo Moscow Region, and registered into the Russian Superleague A.

Triumph Lyubertsy
In 2007, the basketball club of Dynamo Moscow Region disbanded and became the newly reformed club of BC Triumph Lyubertsy Moscow Region. Triumph Lyubertsy retained all the records of the Dynamo Moscow Region club, through the acquisition of the club's rights. In the 2013–14 season, Triumph reached the final of the EuroChallenge, in which it lost to Reggio Emilia by a score of 65–79.

Zenit

2014-2019
In July 2014, the club announced it was relocating from Lyubertsy to Saint Petersburg, and was changing its name to BC Zenit Saint Petersburg. The club retained the rights of BC Triumph Lyubertsy, and also its place in both the VTB United League and the EuroCup. Meanwhile, the club tried to retain a second club in Lyubertsy, that would compete in the Russian Super League 1. As a result, the basketball club became a section of the Zenit sports club, which already contained Zenit FC, a football club.

The team finished fifth in the 2014–15 season, but was eliminated in the quarter-finals. In 2016, Zenit moved from the Sibur Arena to the Yubileyni Arena. In the following four seasons, Zenit qualified for the semi-finals every time, but never reached the league finals.

On 27 June 2019, EuroLeague Basketball awarded Zenit a wild card for the 2019–20 EuroLeague. This would mark Zenit's debut in the highest European tier.

2020-present
In early 2022, in light of the 2022 Russian invasion of Ukraine, American-Puerto Rican  Shabazz Napier left the team. Also leaving the team were Americans Billy Baron, Alex Poythress, Conner Frankamp, Tyson Carter, Jordan Mickey, and Jordan Loyd, as well as Lithuanians Arturas Gudaitis and Mindaugas Kuzminskas, and Polish player Mateusz Ponitka. 

On February 28, 2022, EuroLeague Basketball suspended the team because of the 2022 Russian invasion of Ukraine.

Arenas

When the club moved to St. Petersburg, they first played their home games at the 7,120 seat Sibur Arena. They then moved to the newly renovated 7,000 seat Yubileyni Arena. When the club was previously based in Lyubertsy, they played their home games at the 4,000 seat Triumph Sports Palace arena.

Honours

Domestic competitions
 VTB United League
Winners (1):  2021–22
 Russian Cup
Runner-up (2): 2015–16, 2022–23
 VTB United League Supercup
Winners (1): 2022
Runner-up (1): 2021

European competitions
FIBA Europe Conference North
Winners (2):  2004, 2005
FIBA EuroCup Challenge
Runner-up (1): 2005
FIBA EuroChallenge
Runner-up (1): 2014 
Third place (2): 2009, 2012

Other competitions
Vladimir Kondrashin and Alexander Belov Tournament 
Winners (1): 2021

Season by season

Players

Current roster

Depth chart

Notable players

Head coaches

References

External links 
Official Website
Eurobasket.com Team Page

 
2014 establishments in Russia
Basketball teams established in 2014
Basketball teams in Russia
BC
Sports clubs in Saint Petersburg